Naenae (occasionally spelled NaeNae) is a suburb of Lower Hutt. It lies on the eastern edge of the floodplain of the Hutt River, four kilometres from the Lower Hutt Central business district. A small tributary of the Hutt, the Waiwhetu Stream, flows through the suburb. Naenae lies 19.7 km from Wellington Central.

Naenae's shopping centre contained an Olympic-size swimming-pool, built when New Zealand hosted an international diving championships. The pool had three diving boards. Originally open-air, the complex gained a roof due to overwhelming public support, making it accessible all year round. A hydroslide adjacent to the main pool attracted more people. The toddlers' paddling pool remained open-air for a few years more. The pool closed in April 2019 due to earthquake concerns.

Naenae or nae-nae is a translation from the Māori, meaning "mosquito" or "sandfly", recalling a time prior to the draining of the area, when the mosquito population predominated.

Setting 
Naenae occupies a basin and the lower slopes of the Eastern Hutt Hills in the upper reaches of the Waiwhetu Stream catchment area.

History 

As Lower Hutt expanded after the end of World War II in 1945, the Labour Party government under Peter Fraser selected Naenae as an ideal site to become a "designer community", a model suburb of sorts, where a suburban state-housing estate would complement a substantial shopping centre. This community centre would serve as a social hub for the greater area. The planners hoped to encourage nuclear-family life in such a scheme. Due to the increasing urbanization of New Zealand, demand for housing outstripped the need for such centres, leaving the scheme only partially realized.

Ernst Plischke, an Austrian architect, designed plans for the new community centre between 1942 and 1943. However, government architect Gordon Wilson later drastically changed the design.

Naenae Railway Station (opened 1946), on the Hutt Valley section of the Wairarapa Line, adjoins Naenae's shopping centre.

Naenae's post-modern Post Office building (officially opened in 1966, closed as a postal centre in 2016) pays homage to the Art Deco era Main Post Office in Lower Hutt town centre.

A re-zoning of Naenae made it partly industrial in the 1960s, but it remained principally a residential area. At its peak, Naenae boasted two manufacturers with strong Dutch connections:

 Philips, which produced televisions and radios, see pictures here. This industry closed down during the 1980s: Resene Paints occupied the buildings .
 Rembrandt Suits Ltd, formed following the Second World War by Dutch tailors. It  exports mainly to Australia, and has major contracts throughout the world.

Demographics

Naenae had a population of 8,700 at the 2018 New Zealand census, an increase of 516 people (6.3%) since the 2013 census, and an increase of 414 people (5.0%) since the 2006 census. There were 2,913 households. There were 4,272 males and 4,422 females, giving a sex ratio of 0.97 males per female, with 2,046 people (23.5%) aged under 15 years, 1,980 (22.8%) aged 15 to 29, 3,831 (44.0%) aged 30 to 64, and 843 (9.7%) aged 65 or older.

Ethnicities were 53.6% European/Pākehā, 29.3% Māori, 24.5% Pacific peoples, 10.9% Asian, and 3.9% other ethnicities (totals add to more than 100% since people could identify with multiple ethnicities).

The proportion of people born overseas was 23.1%, compared with 27.1% nationally.

Although some people objected to giving their religion, 42.7% had no religion, 41.2% were Christian, 1.8% were Hindu, 1.5% were Muslim, 1.1% were Buddhist and 4.6% had other religions.

Of those at least 15 years old, 945 (14.2%) people had a bachelor or higher degree, and 1,692 (25.4%) people had no formal qualifications. The employment status of those at least 15 was that 3,096 (46.5%) people were employed full-time, 855 (12.8%) were part-time, and 519 (7.8%) were unemployed.

Education 
Naenae has four schools:

Naenae School is a state contributing primary (Year 1–6) school serving the southern half of the suburb. It has  students as of 
Rata Street School is a state contributing primary (Year 1–6) school serving the northern half of the suburb. It has  students as of 
St Bernadette's School is a state-integrated Catholic full primary and intermediate (Year 1–8) school. It has  students as of 
Wa Ora Montessori School is a state-integrated Montessori composite (Year 1–13) school. It has  students as of 

State intermediate students (Year 7–8) and secondary students (Year 9–13) are served by Naenae Intermediate School and Naenae College respectively, which despite their names are located in the adjacent suburb of Avalon.

References

External links
New Housing Estate, Naenae 1944 (photo)

Suburbs of Lower Hutt